Local elections were held in Turkey on 17 November 1963. In the elections, both the mayors and the local parliaments were elected. The figures presented below are the results of the local parliament elections.

Results

Provincial assemblies

Mayors

|

|

|

|

References

Local elections in Turkey
Local